The 2nd constituency of the Haute-Loire (French: Deuxième circonscription de la Haute-Loire) is a French legislative constituency in the Haute-Loire département. Like the other 576 French constituencies, it elects one MP using a two round electoral system.

Description

One of only two seats in the department, the 2nd Constituency of the Haute-Loire covers the eastern portion of the department. The constituency includes the prefecture of Le Puy-en-Velay.

The constituency has consistently elected deputies from the centre right.

Assembly Members

Election Results

2022

 
 
 
 
|-
| colspan="8" bgcolor="#E9E9E9"|
|-

2017

2012

References

2